The Houma–Yueshan railway or Houyue railway, is a railway line in northern China between Houma in Shanxi Province and the railway junction of Yueshan in Bo'ai County of neighboring Henan Province. The line entered into operations in January 1996 and forms part of the southern rail corridor for the transport of coal from Shanxi Province.

Route
In the west, the Houyue railway commences branches off of the Datong–Puzhou railway at Houma in southwestern Shanxi and runs due east through Yicheng and Qinshui to the Qin River, in south central Shanxi, and follows the river south, past Yancheng into Henan.  At the Liandong railway station near Jiyuan, the line joins the Jiaozuo-Liuzhou railway and follows that line east to the Yueshan railway station in Bo'ai County.

Rail connections
 Houma: Houma–Xi'an railway
 Jiyuan (Liandong railway station): Jiaozuo–Liuzhou railway to Yueshan

See also

 List of railways in China

References

Railway lines in China
Rail transport in Shanxi
Rail transport in Henan
Railway lines opened in 1996